Acleris dentata is a species of moth of the family Tortricidae. It is found in Japan (Honshu).

The wingspan is 18–22 mm.

The larvae feed on Tilia japonica.

References

Moths described in 1966
dentata
Moths of Japan